Yigal Arnon & Co., established nearly sixty years ago, is one of the largest law firms in Israel with offices in Tel Aviv and Jerusalem, and more than 170 lawyers, of whom 61 are partners. Yigal Arnon & Co. provides a full range of legal services to meet the differing needs of clients across a variety of industries. Among other things, the firm is recognized for its substantial international practice, including its activities in the US, UK, Europe, India, China, the Far East, and other countries throughout the world.

History 
Adv. Yigal Arnon (z"l) opened his first office in Jerusalem in the late 1950s. He was quickly recognized as a talented young attorney and, within just a few years, he was considered a leading advocate in the field of civil law, first in Jerusalem and then throughout the country. Over the years, the firm added partners who specialized in different areas of law, creating a professional conglomerate constituting one of the largest and most successful firms in Israel. Most of the firm's partners have grown with the firm, from internship through work as an associate, to being accepted as partners.

Yigal Arnon & Co. is situated throughout a number of buildings on a Jerusalem campus, each of which maintains and contributes to the unique Jerusalem landscape, and which has been the subject of great architectural interest. Its Tel Aviv offices are located on a number of floors in two of the Azrieli Towers.

Practice Areas

Clients 
Yigal Arnon & Co. maintains a diverse client base, including major international ("Fortune 500") and other global companies, local and foreign banks, financial institutions, venture capital and private equity funds, emerging growth companies, investor groups, government entities, and individuals. Clients span a variety of industries, including information technology, energy (solar power and cleantech), banking, software, electronics, semiconductors, pharmaceuticals, biotechnology, internet, medical devices, real estate, telecommunications, insurance, automotive, and consumer products.

Selected representations include

Corporate/M&A 
 Serving as Israeli counsel to Cloudlock in its purchase by CISCO for US$293 million.
 Harel Group and Israel Infrastructure Fund in their acquisition of a stake of the Tamar Gas Field from Noble Energy Mediterranean Ltd., with an option to purchase an additional amount.
 A Shanghai-based venture capital fund in several early-stage investments with Israeli medical device companies.
 Serving as Israeli counsel to IBM in its acquisition of EZ legacy Ltd. for US$40 million. 
 Hyperion Therapeutics in its acquisition of Andromeda Biotech Ltd. for US$570 million.
 Serving as Israeli counsel to Shanghai Giant Network Technology Co. in its acquisition of Playtika for US$4.4 billion.
 A government-backed Chinese technology incubator and venture capital fund in an investment and licensing transaction with an Israeli agrotech company. 
 Otic Pharma Ltd. in the sale of all its shares to Tokai Pharmaceuticals, Inc., a US public company traded on NASDAQ. 
 FutuRx Ltd., a biotechnology incubator that includes two world leading pharmaceutical companies: Johnson & Johnson and Takeda Pharmaceuticals, as well as OrbiMed. 
 Oramed Pharmaceuticals (NASDAQ:ORMP), developer of orally ingestible insulin capsules for the treatment of diabetes, in a multimillion-dollar licensing and manufacturing transaction with Hefei Tianhui Incubation of Technologies Co., Ltd. 
 Chinese conglomerate Kuang Chi in a US$20 million investment and joint venture collaboration with Israeli company eyeSight Technologies Ltd.
 Ongoing representation of OrbiMed, a leading life science investment fund and a major shareholder in cCam, and most recently in connection with the sale of cCam to Merck (value reported in the press to be US$605 million).

Banking and Finance/Capital Markets 
 Underwriters and lenders (HSBC, JPMorgan, BNB Paribas) of the Leviathan Gas Field Project with loan agreements totaling up to US$2.15 billion, in the largest project financing ever held in Israel for a project in the development phase. 
 A group of six banks with respect to potential data collaboration for the purpose of implementing Basel II models (IRB) and the firm continues to provide advice regarding the implementation of the Basel II Israeli regulations. 
 Morgan Securities, CitiGroup Global Markets, and HSBC Securities (USA) as the lead underwriters of a private placement to Israeli and foreign institutional investors of senior secured notes in the aggregate amount of US$2 billion, issued by Delek & Avner (Tamar Bond) Ltd. This offering is one of the largest ever in Israel, and the largest ever debut US dollar project bond issuance to be rated investment grade. 
 Tower Semiconductor Ltd. (TASE/NASDAQ:TSEM), a dual listed company, in all its corporate and securities matters, including, among others, a US$90 million universal shelf registration statement in the US and its subsequent rights offering of US$22 million in both Israel and the US, and a public offering in Israel of US$80 million of convertible debentures and warrants.

Commercial Litigation 
 Google in various proceedings related to all of its products and services, some of which raised precedential legal questions in regards to the rights of the individual in a modernized community with respect to defamation, privacy, and more. 
 The Israel Broadcasting Authority and its court ordered liquidation. Yigal Arnon & Co. was appointed as legal counsel, responsible for handling all matters related to this complex insolvency. 
 El-Al in several matters, including a derivative action in the amount of millions of dollars against El-Al's management, alleging damages caused to the company due to failures of the BOD, and in a monetary action brought by El Al's former contractor regarding the alleged breach of contract regarding a co-branded credit card in the US. 
 Bezeq, Israel's largest and leading telecommunications group, in a derivative action in an amount over NIS 1 billion.  
 Some of Israel's largest banks, including Bank Leumi le-Israel in a NIS 120 million derivative action, Israel Discount Bank in various dispute resolution matters, and the First International Bank of Israel in several legal proceedings. 
 The Israel Ministry of Transportation, the Israel Ministry of Finance, and the Jerusalem Municipality in matters relating to the preparation and management of the tender for the Jerusalem Light Rail Project, including ongoing legal services throughout the various construction, financing, and implementation stages.

Rankings 
"The service from Yigal Arnon is second to none. The firm has shown a high level of professionalism, and excellent availability. This firm has a very good reputation, and is known for its abilities in international work."

"The firm is very impressive. The lawyers provide smart advice and are very business-oriented. The team acts very fast but always in a calm way."

"They are excellent and very sophisticated in knowing how to get the job done for us as a client. They establish what is best for us in each case, and their customer service is top notch."

The firm is ranked highly, year after year, in both international and national rankings.
 Legal500 EMEA Leading Firm
 IFLR1000 Financial and Corporate Top Tier Firm
 Global Chambers and Partners Top Ranked
 Globes Dun's 100 Mark of Excellence
 BDi CODE
 MERGERMARKET

References

External links
 Yigal Arnon & Co. Profile Dun's 100- 2005
 Yigal Arnon & Co. Profile, BDI Code- 2005 (PDF file)

Law firms established in 1957
Law firms of Israel